Loara may refer to:

 PZA Loara, military vehicle
 Loara High School, a public high school in Anaheim, California